Psychroflexus saliphilus  is a Gram-negative, rod-shaped and non-motile bacteria from the genus of Psychroflexus which has been isolated from a marine solar saltern from Weihai in China.

References

External links
Type strain of Psychroflexus saliphilus at BacDive -  the Bacterial Diversity Metadatabase

Flavobacteria
Bacteria described in 2016